This List of members of the Senate for the 79th West Virginia Legislature  is current as of May 2010.

Leadership of the 79th West Virginia Senate

Members of the 79th West Virginia Senate

Composition of the 79th West Virginia Senate

2009–2011:

See also 
West Virginia Senate
List of presidents of the West Virginia Senate
List of members of the 78th West Virginia Senate

References

External links 
West Virginia Legislature Homepage
Senate District Map
WV Secretary of State – 2008 State Senate Returns (PDF)
WV Secretary of State – 2006 State Senate Returns (PDF)

West Virginia Senate 79th
West Virginia legislative sessions
79